Richard Hartis (born 16 September 1967) is an English coach, and is the current senior goalkeeping coach of  club Manchester United.

Coaching career
From 1987 to 1990 he was the youth goalkeeping coach at Sheffield United. He then proceeded to work at Mercyhurst College for six years, three years as head coach for the Men's and Women's teams from 1994 to 1997. 

In three seasons under Hartis, the men's team made the NCAA Division II Final Four once and the Elite Eight once. During his tenure with the Women's program, they made the NCAA tournament two out of three years.

Hartis then returned to England in 1997 to become goalkeeping coach at Leeds United Academy. He remained at Leeds until the summer of 2000 having worked with all academy ages including the reserves. He left Leeds to join former Leeds United Academy staff Alan Hill, Steve Beaglehole and Daral Pugh at Leicester City as head academy goalkeeping coach. Hartis remained at Leicester for only one season, before joining Manchester United as head academy goalkeeping coach. Hartis also become acting first-team goalkeeping coach during Manchester United's double run in 2007–08, working with goalkeepers Edwin van der Sar, Ben Foster, Tomasz Kuszczak and Tom Heaton. He spent 10 years at Manchester United before leaving.

In January 2011, he was appointed to first-team goalkeeping coach at Norwegian Club Molde as part of the staff for Ole Gunnar Solskjær. He remained there at Molde for three years.

On 2 January 2014, Hartis was appointed first-team goalkeeping coach at Cardiff City as part of Ole Gunnar Solskjær's coaching team. He left Cardiff along with Ole Gunnar Solskjær in September 2014.

On 9 June 2015, he was unveiled as the new goalkeeping coach for Leeds United as part of Uwe Rösler's new backroom team. 

On 21 April 2016, Hartis joined The FA as a national goalkeeping coach for the professional development phase (U18 to U20), eventually going on to be a member of the England coaching staff that lifted the 2017 FIFA U-20 World Cup.

On 22 June 2019, Hartis re-joined Manchester United as senior goalkeeping coach.

References

Molde FK non-playing staff
Leeds United F.C. non-playing staff
1967 births
Living people